Ayersville is an unincorporated community in Stephens County, in the U.S. state of Georgia. A variant name was "Ayers".

History
Ayersville was named after Jeremiah and Nathaniel Ayers, pioneers who arrived ca. 1810. A post office called Ayersville was established in 1874, and remained in operation until 1955. In 1900, the community had 79 inhabitants.

References

Unincorporated communities in Stephens County, Georgia
Unincorporated communities in Georgia (U.S. state)